"Instant Replay" is a song by Dan Hartman from the album Instant Replay. The song reached number 29 on the Billboard Hot 100 pop singles chart, while topping out on the R&B chart at number 44. In the UK, the song peaked at number 8 in November 1978.

Music video
The video for the song features Hartman alongside future Kiss lead guitarist Vinnie Vincent, Hilly Michaels from the band Sparks on drums, and future Hall & Oates guitarist and Saturday Night Live band leader G.E. Smith on bass. Backing vocalist Blanche Napoleon did not appear in the video, though her vocals can still be heard.

Chart performance

Weekly charts

Year-end charts

Cover versions
The song was covered in 1990 by the UK pop duo Yell!, reaching number 10 in the UK Singles Chart.

References

External links
[ Dan Hartman's Chart History] at AllMusic
[ Dan Hartman's Chart History] at Billboard.com

1978 songs
1978 singles
Dan Hartman songs
1990 debut singles
Disco songs
Songs written by Dan Hartman
Song recordings produced by Dan Hartman
Blue Sky Records singles